The 2019 Little League Softball World Series was held in Portland, Oregon from August 7 to August 14, 2019. Ten teams, four international teams and six from the from the United States, competed for the Little League Softball World Series Championship.

Teams
Each team that competed in the tournament came out of one of the 10 regions.

Results

All times US EST.

Elimination round

References

Little League Softball World Series
2019 in softball
2019 in sports in Oregon